UltraMix is a series of mixed dance compilation albums released by Ultra Records, focusing on the more commercially popular songs of the year. The series, like most Ultra Records compilations, is known for the attractive women that grace the album covers.

Releases
Ultra.Mix - Vic Latino (September 23, 2008)
UltraMix 2 - Vic Latino (September 22, 2009)
UltraMix 3 - (March 6, 2010)

External links
UltraRecords.com

Compilation album series
Ultra Music
Dance music compilation albums